RNA polymerase-associated protein LEO1 is an enzyme that in humans is encoded by the LEO1 gene.

References

Further reading